John "JP" Poliquin (born August 24, 1986) is a Canadian music video, commercial and feature film director. He has directed music videos for bands such as  Hedley, Finger Eleven, Mother Mother, and Carly Rae Jepsen, and his music video work has been nominated for awards at the Juno Awards, the MuchMusic Video Awards, the East Coast Music Association Awards, the PEI Music Awards, and the Leo Awards. His video for Hedley "Anything" won Video of the Year, Pop Video of the Year and Your Fave Video at the 2014 MuchMusic Video Awards.

His 2008 short film "Inside Charlie" has been nominated for a number of awards. In 2012, John Poliquin directed the found-footage horror film Grave Encounters 2, his first feature film as director. He has also directed videos for The Next Star, a series aired on the youth-oriented Canadian television network YTV.  Poliquin has also appeared on MuchMusic's television program New.Music.Live as an industry expert. Most recently, Poliquin co-wrote the upcoming horror film Room 203.

Early life, education
John "JP" Poliquin was born on August 24, 1986 in North Vancouver, British Columbia. In his youth he would use his father's video camera to shoot "crazy short films and skateboard videos." As a high school student he attended Handsworth Secondary School in Vancouver, and during the summers would work on local film sets. Around 2005 this included working as a production assistant on projects such as Merlin's Apprentice, John Tucker Must Die, and Snakes on a Plane, and by 2006 he was also working on sets such as Her Fatal Flaw as a camera trainee. In 2009 he served as a grip in Santa Buddies and a location production assistant for the TV movie Web of Desire. Stated Poliquin, "I worked in tons of different departments (assistant directing, camera, grip, props, locations, etc.) and realized that what I really wanted to do was direct. Even if it was low budget I knew I'd enjoy that role more." He graduated with a BFA in New Media and Film from the University of Lethbridge in Alberta.

Film career

Early years
Among Poliquin's first directorial projects was the short film "Inside Charlie," released in 2007. The film, which he co-wrote, followed the story of a photographer seeking to take a picture to save his career. At the 2008 Calgary International Film Festival it was nominated for both "Best New Film" and "Audience Favorite."

Music videos
By 2010 Poliquin was active in directing music videos for artists, many signed to major labels in Canada. Among the bands he has worked with are Hey Ocean!, Tim Chaisson, Hedley, Finger Eleven, My Darkest Days, Mother Mother, Arkells, Theory of a Deadman, The Trews, Small Sins, The New Cities, Paper Lions, illScarlett, The Latency, Brock Zanrosso, Victoria Duffield, State of Shock, and Gary Beals. Poliquin was nominated for his first major music video award in 2010, when "A Song About California" by Hey Ocean! was nominated for "Best New Video" at the Leo Awards. His music video work has since been nominated for awards at the Juno Awards, the MuchMusic Video Awards, the East Coast Music Association Awards, and the PEI Music Awards.

In 2010, Tim Chaisson's band filmed their first music video for "Broken Hearted Beat" in Toronto with Poliquin. The video was released in May 2010 on CMT and also made it to the #1 spot on Much More Music’s Top 10.  Immediately following the video’s release, its single was released and made it to #1 on the East Coast Countdown. The music video for "Slippin’ Away", also directed by Poliquin, was released in October 2010. It reached #8 on the Much More Music Top 20 Countdown. Also in 2010, the band Paper Lions had the Poliquin-directed video for their single "Lost the War" nominated for a 2010 CBC Radio 3 Bucky Award.

John JP Poliquin has appeared on-air several times on MuchMusic's television program New.Music.Live, sitting on an expert panel to discuss industry music videos and adding entries to their official blog. In January 2012, his music video for Light Organ Records artist Adaline "The Noise" premiered exclusively with Andy Warhol's Interview Magazine.

Film and television
From 2010 to 2012 he directed segments for The Next Star, a series aired on the youth-oriented Canadian television network YTV.

In 2012, Poliquin directed the found-footage horror film Grave Encounters 2, the sequel to the 2011 cult hit Grave Encounters, which is his first film as director. Written and produced by the Canadian filmmaker duo The Vicious Brothers, the film follows a film student investigating the found footage from the sequel. The film received mixed reviews, but like its predecessor, many were largely positive, particularly concerning Poliquin's directorship. According to Dread Central, "if you look at just the first two acts, it is one of the most smartly written... and directed movies this reviewer has seen all year. At the helm is John Poliquin, and he takes the events of the first film and builds upon them in the most clever of ways. Poliquin's direction is beyond spot on, and he and the Vicious Brothers collectively managed to deliver an almost perfect sequel to Grave Encounters."

In 2020, Poliquin co-wrote the horror film Room 203, based on the novel of the same name by Japanese writer Nanami Kamon. The film's worldwide sales rights were subsequently acquired by Voltage Pictures, with the domestic distribution rights acquired by Vertical Entertainment.

Style and themes
About his influences, Poliquin has stated his favorite directors include David Fincher, Michel Gondry, Jonas Akerlund, and Dougal Wilson, and that "For horror films, Hitchcock and Kubrick are my idols."

Personal life
He currently resides in Los Angeles.

Filmography

Films

Television

Music videos

Awards and nominations

Further reading

See also
Grave Encounters 2

References

External links
JohnPoliquin.com
The Field

Canadian music video directors
1986 births
Living people
LGBT film directors
People from North Vancouver
Film directors from British Columbia
21st-century Canadian LGBT people